Manifesto is the fourth studio album by American rapper, and Wu-Tang Clan member Inspectah Deck. The album was released on March 23, 2010, by Urban Icons Records and Traffic Entertainment Group. The album features guest appearances from Raekwon, Cappadonna, Cormega, Kurupt, Planet Asia, Termanology, Carlton Fisk, Billy Danze and Fes Taylor. Initially, the album  was slated to be titled Resident Patient II, as a sequel to Inspectah Deck's 2006 album The Resident Patient. However, a mixtape entitled Resident Patient II leaked in 2008 that was not the actual product. Deck eventually changed the name of the project and is still planning to release his final album under the name The Rebellion. Manifesto is composed of songs originally cut from Resident Patient II.

Track listing

Charts

References 

Manifesto, The
Inspectah Deck albums
Albums produced by the Alchemist (musician)
Albums produced by Agallah
Albums produced by Fred Warmsley